Stavení is a 1990 Czechoslovak film. The film starred Josef Kemr.

References

External links
 

1990 films
Czechoslovak drama films
1990s Czech-language films
Czech drama films